Franco Maximiliano Lefiñir (born 23 October 1998) is an Argentine professional footballer who plays as a midfielder for Olimpo.

Career
Tiro Federal of Bahía Blanca gave Lefiñir his start in senior football in 2007, with the midfielder featuring for the Torneo Argentino C club as they suffered 2009 relegation. 2012 saw Lefiñir join Racing de Trelew in Torneo Argentino B, remaining for one season whilst making twenty-seven appearances and scoring four goals. He returned to Tiro Federal ahead of the 2013–14 campaign, with the club now in the fourth tier. In the succeeding season, Tiro Federal were promoted to Torneo Federal A. His first goals at that level arrived on 22 May 2015 during a match away to General Belgrano, netting a brace in a 0–3 victory. Three further goals came.

In 2016, having netted another double away to General Belgrano, Tiro Federal were relegated to Torneo Federal B. Two years later, in June 2018, Lefiñir completed a move to Primera B Nacional's Olimpo. He made his professional debut against Sarmiento on 26 August.

Personal life
In May 2016, Lefiñir was hospitalised due to carbon monoxide poisoning. He was discharged soon after, having not lost consciousness during the incident.

Career statistics
.

References

External links

1988 births
Living people
Sportspeople from Bahía Blanca
Argentine footballers
Association football midfielders
Torneo Argentino C players
Torneo Argentino B players
Torneo Federal A players
Primera Nacional players
Racing de Trelew players
Olimpo footballers